The Big Narstie Show is a British chat show, presented by rapper Big Narstie and comedian Mo Gilligan, that debuted on Channel 4 on 29 June 2018. Big Narstie is a rapper from the grime scene and has been cited as one of the original purveyors in the grime comedy genre.

Production
On 2 February 2018, Channel 4 announced that they had commissioned a new "late night, alternative entertainment show" titled The Big Narstie Show.

The Big Narstie Show is produced for Channel 4 by Expectation and Dice Productions Entertainment. The executive producers are Ben Wicks for Expectation and Obi Kevin Akudike and Nathan Brown for Dice Productions Entertainment.

The show has received many accolades including Royal Television Society Awards, an Mvisa, a National Reality TV Award, an Edinburgh TV Award and a Bafta.

Episodes

Series 1 (2018)

Series 2 (2019)

Series 3 (2020)

Series 4 (2021)

Series 5 (2022)

References

External links
 
 
 

2018 British television series debuts
2010s British comedy television series
2010s British television talk shows
2020s British comedy television series
2020s British television talk shows
Channel 4 comedy
Channel 4 talk shows
English-language television shows